William Bower (18 September 1887 – February 1954) was a footballer He started his career with Peel Institute where he played football and cricket, he later played in the Football League for Clapton Orient and later with New Brompton, in 1921 he became their trainer / manager and in 1947 their groundsman.

References

English footballers
Leyton Orient F.C. players
Gillingham F.C. players
English Football League players
1880s births
1954 deaths
Association football goalkeepers
People from Dalston
Footballers from the London Borough of Hackney